Revolución is the second studio album by Australian–American hard rock band The Dead Daisies. It was released on August 31, 2015, by Spitfire Music and peaked at No. 52 on the ARIA Albums Chart.

Track listing
Credits are adapted from disc booklet.

Personnel
The Dead Daisies
John Corabi – vocals, acoustic guitar
David Lowy – guitar
Richard Fortus – guitar
Dizzy Reed – keyboards, backing vocals
Marco Mendoza – bass, backing vocals
Jackie Barnes – drums, percussion, backing vocals

Additional personnel
Brian Tichy – drums on "Evil" and "Midnight Moses"
Yaimi Karell Lay – percussion on "Evil" and "Midnight Moses"
Jimmy Barnes – vocals on "Empty Heart"

Production
Craig Porteils – producer, engineer
Ben Grosse – producer, engineer, mixing
Owen Butcher, Dayana Rodríguez Hernández, Amhed Ali González Pérez – assistant engineers
Paul Pavao – mixing assistant
Tom Baker – mastering

References 

2015 albums
The Dead Daisies albums